Hemingford is a village in Box Butte County, Nebraska, United States. The population was 803 at the 2010 census.

History
Hemingford was incorporated as a village in 1886. The founder being a native of Hemmingford, Quebec, caused the name to be selected.

Geography
Hemingford is located at  (42.320048, -103.073475).

Climate

Demographics

2010 census
As of the census of 2010, there were 803 people, 335 households, and 220 families residing in the village. The racial makeup of the village was 96.1% White, 0.4% African American, 1.2% Native American, 0.1% from other races, and 2.1% from two or more races. Hispanic or Latino of any race were 4.6% of the population.

There were 335 households, of which 31.9% had children under the age of 18 living with them, 50.1% were married couples living together, 11.9% had a female householder with no husband present, 3.6% had a male householder with no wife present, and 34.3% were non-families. 31.6% of all households were made up of individuals, and 13.8% had someone living alone who was 65 years of age or older. The average household size was 2.31 and the average family size was 2.91.

The median age in the village was 42.2 years. 26.9% of residents were under the age of 18; 5.6% were between the ages of 18 and 24; 21.1% were from 25 to 44; 31.1% were from 45 to 64; and 15.3% were 65 years of age or older. The gender makeup of the village was 48.4% male and 51.6% female.

2000 census
As of the census of 2000, there were 993 people, 373 households, and 258 families residing in the village. The population density was 1,530.4 people per square mile (589.8/km2). There were 438 housing units at an average density of 675.1 per square mile (260.2/km2). The racial makeup of the village was 93.15% White, 1.01% Native American, 3.32% from other races, and 2.52% from two or more races. Hispanic or Latino of any race were 6.85% of the population.

There were 373 households, out of which 38.9% had children under the age of 18 living with them, 56.3% were married couples living together, 9.9% had a female householder with no husband present, and 30.6% were non-families. 28.4% of all households were made up of individuals, and 15.0% had someone living alone who was 65 years of age or older. The average household size was 2.58 and the average family size was 3.18.

In the village, the population was spread out, with 30.5% under the age of 18, 7.0% from 18 to 24, 25.9% from 25 to 44, 20.6% from 45 to 64, and 15.9% who were 65 years of age or older. The median age was 38 years. For every 100 females, there were 97.0 males. For every 100 females age 18 and over, there were 90.1 males.

As of 2000 the median income for a household in the village was $35,982, and the median income for a family was $44,167. Males had a median income of $32,159 versus $20,500 for females. The per capita income for the village was $14,944. About 8.8% of families and 10.2% of the population were below the poverty line, including 10.9% of those under age 18 and 16.4% of those age 65 or over.

Disasters

The tower collapsed on September 24, 2002, during reconstruction work. Two tower workers, Lawrence A. Sukalec, 59, of Valier, Illinois, and Daniel E. Goff, 25, of Sesser, Illinois, were killed in the process, and three were injured on the ground. The collapse occurred as strengthening measures were being taken so the 30+ year-old tower could accommodate the added weight of digital television transmission facilities. Investigations later found that the contractors neglected to stabilize the tower while original structural components were being replaced with stronger ones.

KDUH resumed full-power broadcasts one year later from a new tower near Angora.

In popular culture
Author Stephen King adapted Hemingford's name for the fictional town of Hemingford Home, Nebraska, which appears in several of his works.

References

Villages in Box Butte County, Nebraska
Villages in Nebraska